The Petrov Cup, previously Bratina Cup is the trophy awarded to the winner of the play-off of the Major League (Vysshaya Liga) until 2010 and the trophy awarded to the winner of the play-off of the Major Hockey League (VHL) since the 2010–11 season. The names of winning clubs inscribed on the trophy are from the 1999–00 season onward. The trophy weights almost 19 kg (41.89 lbs).

The current 2021 holders of the trophy is HC Yugra, The team with the most Petrov/Bratina Cup championships, is Toros Neftekamsk, with three wins, who defeated HC Izhstal in the Best-of-seven final series 4 games to 2 in 2015.

Winners

See also
Gagarin Cup, KHL main trophy
Kharlamov Cup, MHL main trophy

References

External links
An article on Sports.ru with the photo of the trophy
Bratina Cup displayed on the front page of the VHL website

Russian ice hockey trophies and awards
Russian Major League